Emmanuel Nayabtigungu Congo Kaboré (born 20 June 1948) is a Burkinabé politician and leader of the Movement for Tolerance and Progress (MTP) party.

References

1948 births
Living people
Movement for Tolerance and Progress politicians
Sankarists
21st-century Burkinabé people